Franz Rauch (15 October 1878 – 23 May 1960) was a German screenwriter and actor. He began his career as a stage actor and worked as a screenwriter on over forty films during his career and appeared in several roles as an actor.

Selected filmography

References

Bibliography
 Gero Gandert. 1929. Walter de Gruyter, 1993.

External links

1878 births
1960 deaths
German male screenwriters
German male stage actors
German male film actors
German male silent film actors
People from Stralsund
20th-century German male actors
Film people from Mecklenburg-Western Pomerania
20th-century German screenwriters